Senator Kinney may refer to:

Asa Kinney (1810–1886), Wisconsin State Senate
Coates Kinney (1826–1904), Ohio State Senate
Henry Kinney (1814–1862), Texas State Senate
Kevin Kinney (politician) (born 1963), Iowa State Senate
Mary Strong Kinney (1859–1938), Oregon State Senate
Michael Kinney (1875–1971), Missouri State Senate
Ole G. Kinney (1858–1922), Wisconsin State Senate
Thomas Kinney (1868–1912), Missouri State Senate
William Kinney (Illinois politician) (1781–1843), Illinois State Senate